Plastic Temptation is an album by Uri Caine's Bedrock with Tim Lefebvre and Zach Danziger which was released on the Winter & Winter label in 2009.

Reception

In his review for Allmusic, Alex Henderson notes that "as eclectic and far-reaching as Plastic Temptation is, Caine and his associates never sound confused or unfocused. In fact, the 61-minute CD is admirably cohesive. Plastic Temptation will come as a surprise to those who associate Caine with jazz-minded interpretations of Beethoven, Mozart, and Bach, but it's an exciting journey if one is open to hearing a totally different side of the risk-taking musician".

Track listing
All compositions by Uri Caine, Tim Lefebvre & Zach Danziger except as indicated
 "Overture" – 1:51  
 "Prelude for Sheldon" – 2:41  
 "Noid" – 4:34  
 "Roll With It" (Caine, Danziger, Lefebvre, Barbara Walker) – 4:46  
 "Duke Countdown" (Caine, Danziger) – 0:29  
 "Count Duke" – 3:52  
 "Riled Up" – 4:23  
 "Till You Come Back To Me" (Caine, Danziger, Lefebvre, Walker) – 5:53  
 "Plastic Temptation" – 4:39  
 "Seven Year Glitch" (Caine, Danziger) – 1:58  
 "Work It Out" (Caine, Danziger, Lefebvre, Walker, Andrew (Benjamin) Sterling Cannon) – 4:29  
 "Mayor Goldie" (Caine, Danziger) – 6:00  
 "Victrola" (Caine, Danziger) – 2:14  
 "Lemonana Vasconcelos" (Caine, Danziger, Lefebvre, Walker) – 4:27  
 "Ink Bladder" (Caine, Danziger) – 2:22  
 "Lunchmeat Concerto in Eb Minor" (Caine, Danziger) – 1:18  
 "Garcia" – 2:11  
 "Organ Thunder" – 2:55

Personnel
Uri Caine – keyboards
Tim Lefebvre – bass, guitar
Zach Danziger – drums
Elizabeth Pupo-Walker – percussion
Barbara Walker – vocals

Technical credits
 Nathan Rosborough – Audio engineer
 Hugh Pool – Audio engineer
 Excello Recording, Brooklyn, NY – Recording studio

References

Winter & Winter Records albums
Uri Caine albums
2009 albums